The 2013–14 Liechtenstein Cup is the 69th season of Liechtenstein's annual cup competition. Seven clubs compete with a total of 18 teams for one spot in the first qualifying round of the 2014–15 UEFA Europa League. FC Vaduz are the defending champions.

Participating clubs

First round
The First Round featured twelve teams. The games were played on 20, 21 and 28 August 2013.

|colspan="3" style="background-color:#99CCCC; text-align:center;"|20 August 2013

|-
|colspan="3" style="background-color:#99CCCC; text-align:center;"|21 August 2013

|-
|colspan="3" style="background-color:#99CCCC; text-align:center;"|28 August 2013

|}

Second round
The six winners of the First Round, along with FC Schaan and FC Ruggell competed in the Second Round. The games were played on 1 and 2 October 2013.

|colspan="3" style="background-color:#99CCCC; text-align:center;"|1 October 2013

|-
|colspan="3" style="background-color:#99CCCC; text-align:center;"|2 October 2013

|}

Quarterfinals
The four winners of the Second Round, along with FC Vaduz, USV Eschen/Mauren, FC Balzers and FC Triesenberg competed in the quarterfinals. The games were played on 5 and 12 November 2013.

|colspan="3" style="background-color:#99CCCC; text-align:center;"|29 October 2013

|-
|colspan="3" style="background-color:#99CCCC; text-align:center;"|30 October 2013

|-
|colspan="3" style="background-color:#99CCCC; text-align:center;"|5 November 2013

|-
|colspan="3" style="background-color:#99CCCC; text-align:center;"|6 November 2013

|}

Semifinals

|-
|colspan="3" style="background-color:#99CCCC; text-align:center;"|8 April 2014

|-
|colspan="3" style="background-color:#99CCCC; text-align:center;"|9 April 2014

|}

Final

References

External links
 
RSSSF

Liechtenstein Football Cup seasons
Cup
Liechtenstein Cup